Orquestra Mahatma (sometimes credited as Orqestra Mahatma) is an eclectic UK band which draws heavily on international music including Spanish, French, Bulgarian, Macedonian and Latin-American as well as jazz influences.

The members of the Orquestra are violinist Sonia Slany, string player Stuart Hall, bassist Thad Kelly and drummer Paul Clarvis.

Discography
Nightingale of a Thousand Joys (a 1999 Collaboration with Solid Strings). 
Diminuendo In Blue 
Nyari/Hora Din Muntenia 
Elderberries 
Stardust 
Blue Of The Night 
Der Heyser Bulgar 
Bashraf Bulbul Al-Afrah 
Yolande 
White Christmas 
One Little Crocodile 
Kopanitsa 
Planino/Erghen Diado 
Stranger in Paradise
Moonglow/Picnic 
Somewhere 
Lobbydobby

A Young Person's Guide (Released: 1 January 1996, Cat No: BDV 9612)
Mladeshki Dance (4:03)
Mercy, Mercy, Mercy (3:59)
Tsone Milo Chedo/Elena Mome (1:37)
Stars Fell on Alabama (4:38)
Under the Double Eagle (2:15)
Misturada/Sitna Lisa (5:50)
Lady L. (4:46)
Cozmek Elimde (5:08)
Kunywa Kidogo (2:02)
Cool Cats Victory (3:00)
Little Rock Getaway (2:10)
I Got it Bad (4:45)
Karsi R115 (2:30)
Como Podens (2:37)
M'Washah (3:38)
Tennessee Waltz (2:40)
Vengan Pollos (3:33)
Golden Slumbers (4:37)

The Nightingale of a Thousand Joys (Released: 1 January 2000, Cat No: 514)
Stay Cool (Released: 1 October 2005, Cat No: BDV 2557)

The Mooche (Duke Ellington)
Sunrise in Montreal (Rabih Abou-Khalil)
Goodnight Waltz (trad. American)
Jota De Porto (trad. Spanish)
Flower of Mexico (trad. American)
Gankino Horo (trad. Bulgarian)
Stay Cool (Victor Claiya)
Moliendo Café (Prado) 
Alma Llanera (Gutierrez)
Longa Farfisa (Riyad al-Sinbati)
Bavno Pomashko (trad. Macedonia )
Melancholie (trad. French)
Una Noche Una Valse (trad. Venezuelan) 
Appalachian Waltz (Sonia Slany)
Alabama Jubilee (Cobb/Yellen)
Golden Slumbers (Gay arr. Arguelles/Bates)

References

External links
Track listings - label
Track listings - Amazon

British instrumental musical groups